Mahmoud El-Sherbini (born 24 September 1937) is an Egyptian wrestler. He competed in the men's Greco-Roman 70 kg at the 1968 Summer Olympics.

References

External links
 

1937 births
Living people
Egyptian male sport wrestlers
Olympic wrestlers of Egypt
Wrestlers at the 1968 Summer Olympics
Sportspeople from Cairo
20th-century Egyptian people